Sami Gayle (born January 22, 1996) is an  American actress. She is best known for her role as Nicky Reagan in the CBS series Blue Bloods.

Early life
Was born and raised in Weston, Florida. Her mother Robin previously owned her own business and currently works as her agent. Her father is Larry Klitzman, an attorney. Gayle was home-schooled and followed Advanced Placement (AP) curricula in all subjects. She was nationally ranked in Public Forum Debate and has received two bids to compete at the Tournament of Champions, putting her among the top debaters nationwide. She studied political science and art history at Columbia University and graduated in 2018.

Career

Gayle began her acting career as Baby June in the off-Broadway production of Gypsy starring Patti LuPone. She reprised her role when the production transferred to Broadway a few months later. She later co-starred in the off-Broadway plays Oohrah! at the Atlantic Theatre Company and MCC Theatre's Family Week under the direction of Jonathan Demme. Gayle was featured in the 2007 Broadway production of Dr. Seuss' How the Grinch Stole Christmas! The Musical.

In addition to her role on Blue Bloods, Gayle guest starred on USA's Royal Pains and had a recurring role on the CBS soap opera As the World Turns. She co-starred in Detachment, directed by Tony Kaye and released in 2012. She also appeared in Stolen  (2012) and The Congress (2013).  She co-starred in the 2014 film adaptation of Vampire Academy, as Mia Rinaldi. In 2018, Gayle starred in the original Netflix romantic comedy Candy Jar.

After appearing as a regular character on Blue Bloods from seasons 2 through 10, Gayle made only one appearance in season 11. There have been no official announcements from Gayle or Blue Bloods producers about the status of her character, the absence being owed to Gayle graduating from Columbia University and being busy with other projects.

In 2023, Gayle returned to theatre, originating the role of Adele the stepsister in the Broadway cast of Andrew Lloyd Webber’s Bad Cinderella.

Filmography

References

External links 

 
 

Living people
People from Weston, Florida
Actresses from Florida
American child actresses
21st-century American actresses
American soap opera actresses
American stage actresses
American film actresses
American television actresses
Columbia College (New York) alumni
1996 births